St George's Park may refer to:

St George's Park, Bristol, a park in Bristol, England
St George's Park, Port Elizabeth, a multi-use park in Port Elizabeth, South Africa
St George's Park Cricket Ground, the cricket ground at the park, sometimes called Crusaders Ground
St George's Park, Morpeth, a mental health facility in Northumberland
St Georges Park (Newport), an association football stadium on the Isle of Wight
St. George Island State Park, a state park in Florida
St George's Park National Football Centre, Burton